This is a list of the National Register of Historic Places listings in Kendall County, Texas.

This is intended to be a complete list of the properties and districts on the National Register of Historic Places in Kendall County, Texas. There are three districts and eight individual properties listed on the National Register in the county. One district includes two individual properties and contains several State Antiquities Landmarks and Recorded Texas Historic Landmarks. Outside of the district, three other properties are Recorded Texas Historic Landmarks.

Current listings

The locations of National Register properties and districts may be seen in a mapping service provided.

|}

See also

National Register of Historic Places listings in Texas
Recorded Texas Historic Landmarks in Kendall County

References

External links

 
Kendall County